The 2023 Forward Madison FC season will be the fifth season in the soccer team's history, where they compete in USL League One of the third division of American soccer.

Club

Roster

Coaching staff

Front office staff

Transfers

Transfers in

Transfers out

Exhibitions

Competitions

Overview

USL League One

Standings

Results summary

Results by round

Matches

U.S. Open Cup

As a member of USL League One, Forward Madison FC will enter the 2023 U.S. Open Cup in the second round, taking place between April 4-6, 2023.

References

Forward Madison FC seasons
American soccer clubs 2023 season
2023 USL League One season
2023 in sports in Wisconsin